Euura triandrae is a species of sawfly belonging to the family Tenthredinidae (common sawflies). The larvae feed on the leaves of almond willow (Salix triandra) and was first described in 1941.

Description of the gall
The gall is an ovoid, bean-shaped gall, up to 8 mm x 4 mm in size, with a hard thick red wall when occupied.   There are often two galls to a leaf, on either side of the midrib, and they are almost equally prominent on the both sides of a leaf. Galls of E. triandrae are found on almond willow (S. triandra). There are usually two broods in a year (i.e. bivoltine.

Euura triandrae is one of three closely related species in the Euura proxima group. The others members of the group are, 
 E. bridgmanii (Cameron, 1883)
 E. proxima  (Serville, 1823)

Distribution
This species has been found in Great Britain (England), the Netherlands, Norway and Sweden.

References

Tenthredinidae
Gall-inducing insects
Hymenoptera of Europe
Insects described in 1941
Willow galls